In Judaism, the eight sheratzim (Hebrew שמונה שרצים), typically translated as the "eight creeping things", are animals described in , which have special laws in regard to ritual impurity and Shabbat.

Laws
While alive, the eight sheratzim do not convey impurity. However, when one of them has died and is touched or shifted by a human being, it conveys impurity to that person. If he were a priest (Cohen) of Aaron's lineage who touched the animal's corpse, he is forbidden to eat of the hallowed things until he first immerses his body in a mikveh and has waited until the sun has set. During the time when the laws of ritual purity were performed by the Jewish nation, earthenware vessels into which one of the eight, dead creeping things had fallen, including within an earthenware oven, become unclean and unfit for sacred foods, and, therefore, would be broken and the food discarded.

In other applications of Jewish law, a person who either catches or inflicts a wound upon one of the eight creeping things on the Sabbath day becomes culpable by that act, but is held unaccountable and exempt if he had inflicted a wound upon any of the other harmful vermin and creeping things.

Identification

References

Shabbat
Jewish ritual purity law
Animals in the Bible
Hebrew words and phrases in Jewish law